was a Grand Prix motorcycle road racer from Japan.

Itoh was a lifelong employee of Suzuki (mainly concerned with racing and competitions) and began his Grand Prix career in 1961 at the French motorcycle Grand Prix. There he was a DNS in the 125cc Grand Prix and retired on the 3rd Lap in the 250cc Grand Prix. He finished in fifth place in the 50cc world championships, four consecutive years between 1962 and 1965. In 1963, Itoh became the first Japanese rider with a Japanese motor-cycle (Suzuki) to win a race at the Isle of Man TT when he won the 50cc Ultra-Lightweight TT race. He remains the only Japanese rider to have won an Isle of Man TT race. Itoh won two Grand Prix races during his career. Itoh stayed with Suzuki for most of his racing career, even for his brief foray into car racing.

In cars

Itoh competed in a Can-Am style Suzuki Fronte RF single-seater in the JAF Grand Prix Formula Junior "Junior Seven Challenge Cup" race, held at Fuji International Speedway in 1970. He won the race with an average speed of 130.9 km/h. While he was also supposed to have started in the JAF Grand Prix Tournament (also at Fuji) two weeks later, the Junior Seven Challenge Cup victory remained his only start in a JAF race. Itoh also famously partnered with Stirling Moss in December 1968 for a publicity high-speed run along Italy's  Autostrada del Sole, which leads from Milan to Naples.

Motorcycle Grand Prix results 

(key) (Races in italics indicate fastest lap)

References 

1937 births
Japanese motorcycle racers
50cc World Championship riders
125cc World Championship riders
Isle of Man TT riders
2019 deaths